Nanorrhinum webbianum is a species of flowering plant in the family Plantaginaceae, endemic to Cape Verde. The local name of the plant is agrião-de-rocha ("rock-cress").

Distribution and habitat
Nanorrhinum webbianum is found in the island of Santo Antão.

References

webbianum
Endemic flora of Cape Verde
Flora of Santo Antão, Cape Verde